BTG may refer to:

Businesses and organisations
 BTG (company), a British maker of healthcare technology
 Battalion tactical group, a class of Russian military formation
 BT Group, a British telecommunications multinational

Places in England
 Barnt Green railway station, West Midlands
 Bishop Thomas Grant School, London

Other uses
 Bitcoin Gold, a cryptocurrency
 Bradley Trevor Greive, Australian author

See also
 BTG1, a protein-coding gene
 BTG2, another
 BTG3, another